IGNEA is a Ukrainian melodic metal band formed in Kyiv in 2013. The band mixes different heavy metal subgenres, the main of which are melodic death metal, symphonic metal, progressive metal, and oriental metal.

History
In 2013, IGNEA started under the name Parallax and released debut EP titled Sputnik. In 2014, the band released a single Petrichor featuring guitar solo and bouzoukitara part by Yossi Sassi (ex- Orphaned Land).

In 2015, the band changed its name to IGNEA and released a single Alga, with a full symphonic orchestra. The video gathered millions of views on the band’s YouTube channel.

In 2017, IGNEA released The Sign of Faith, the first full-length album, and an animated video for the song Şeytanu Akbar dedicated against terrorism. Later, the band also published an official video for this song recorded at The Best Ukrainian Metal Act, the yearly national awards, where IGNEA was named one of the top three bands in the country.
In 2018, the band released an animated video for How I Hate the Night with references to The Hitchhiker’s Guide to the Galaxy original movie. After that, the band toured with the Danish death metal band Illdisposed in Europe.

In September 2018, IGNEA toured within the Female Metal Voices Tour 2018 headlined by Butcher Babies and Kobra and the Lotus. and released a new single Queen Dies.

Despite the COVID-19 pandemic, IGNEA released its second full-length album The Realms of Fire and Death was released in 2020. It was crowdfunded by the band's patrons at Patreon. The songs Disenchantment and Jinnslammer from this album were previously released as singles with official videos.

The Realms of Fire and Death got an award as the metal album of the year and IGNEA got the award as the best Ukrainian metal band of 2020 according to The Best Ukrainian Metal Act.

In 2021, together with symphonic death metal band ERSEDU, IGNEA self-released a concept split EP BESTIA about the human nature of Slavic mythological creatures and the world’s duality.

In June 2021, IGNEA signed a worldwide deal with Napalm Records.

In February 2022, IGNEA announced the third full-length concept album Dreams of Lands Unseen about Sofia Yablonska to be released on April 28th, 2023.

Band members
 
 Helle Bohdanova – vocals (2013–present)
 Yevhenii Zhytniuk – keyboards (2013–present)
 Oleksandr Kamyshin – bass (2013–present)
 Dmytro Vinnichenko – guitar (2015–present)
 Ivan Kholmohorov – drums (2015–present)

Discography
Albums
 The Sign of Faith (2017)
 The Realms of Fire and Death (2020)
 Dreams of Lands Unseen (2023)

EPs
 Sputnik (2013) EP
 BESTIA (2021) — split with ERSEDU

Singles
 "Petrichor" (2014)
 "Alga" (2015)
 "Queen Dies" (2018)
 "Disenchantment" (2020)
 "Jinnslammer" (2020)
 "Bosorkun" (2021)
 "Mermaids" (2021)
 "Nomad's Luck" (2023)

References

External links
 

Napalm Records artists
Musical groups established in 2013
Ukrainian heavy metal musical groups
Musical groups from Kyiv